Kalra Khasa is a village situated near GT Road Industrial area in the district of Gujrat, Pakistan.

References

Villages in Gujrat District